Senecio antofagastanus is a species of flowering plant in the family Asteraceae. It is endemic to Chile.

References 

antofagastanus
Flora of Chile
Taxa named by Ángel Lulio Cabrera